Kiryl Sidarenka (born 28 August 1995) is a Belarusian professional footballer who plays for Dinamo Brest.

Career

Club
In March 2022, Sidarenka joined Kazakhstan First League club Kaisar having previously appeared once for Kyzylzhar in the Kazakhstan Premier League.

References

External links 
 
 

1995 births
Living people
People from Mogilev
Sportspeople from Mogilev Region
Belarusian footballers
Belarusian expatriate footballers
Expatriate footballers in Russia
Expatriate footballers in Kazakhstan
Association football forwards
FC Amkar Perm players
FC Khimik Svetlogorsk players
FC Vitebsk players
FC Smolevichi players
FC Lokomotiv Gomel players
FC Belshina Bobruisk players
FC Isloch Minsk Raion players
FC Dnepr Mogilev players
FC Kyzylzhar players
FC Kaisar players
FC Dynamo Brest players